Claritas Rupes is a scarp in the Phoenicis Lacus quadrangle of Mars, located at 26° South and 105.4° West.  It is 924 km long and was named after an albedo feature at 25S, 110W.  The term "Rupes" is used in planetary geology to refer to an escarpments or cliff on Mars and other planets.  It is the Latin word for cliff.

References 

Phoenicis Lacus quadrangle
Cliffs on Mars